Bab Ezzouar is a suburb of the city of Algiers in northern Algeria. It is one of Algiers fastest growing municipalities and has seen many hotels and commercial malls being raised in the area. 
Bab Ezzouar is also the location of the University of Science and Technology of Houari Boumediene (USTHB), which is one of the most prominent technological universities in Algeria.

Geography
Access to the commune is by the N11 highway from Algiers which passes through the north of the commune and continues east to join the A1 highway just east of the commune. Many other local roads connect the commune to the surrounding districts. The commune is fully urban in nature.

Transport
The commune is served by the Algiers tramway which runs from the town to Bordj el Kiffan, including:
 Yahia Boushaki tram stop

Neighbouring communes and villages

Urbanism
Bab Ezzouar is a city made up of Commuter towns built successively since the late 1970s on an ancient marshy plain with unplanned subdivisions emerging since the 1990s. It has no real downtown although it hosts several administrations.

The commune consists of 8 different cities which are:

The Cité Ismail Yefsah (2068 dwellings) located in the centre
The Cité Soummam located in the centre and the north-east.
The Cité du 8 Mai 1945 (Sorécal) located to the north of the Algiers northern bypass road (the N11)
The Cité du 5 Juillet 1962 to the south
The Cité Tahar Rabia
The Cité Kourifa Rachid
The Cité El Djorf to the west
The Cité des 498 logements
The Cité EPLF (1080 dwellings)
The Cité 1200 logements
The Cité de la concorde civile (AADL 1)
The Cité AADL 2

Also several Housing Estates:
Boushaki Housing Estates 1 to 5
Douzi Housing Estates 1 to 4

History

The area was known as Retour de la Chasse (Return from Hunting) during French colonial times. At that time there were two hamlets: one French, along the old national road to Algiers airport, and another named Sid M'hamed off the motorway behind the current Cité du 8 Mai 1945.

The commune results from the administrative division of 1984.  Beginning in 2001, the state has constructed several neighborhoods consisting of 22-story residential buildings.

Amenities
At the heart of the commune is the University of Sciences and Technology Houari Boumediene (USTHB) Algiers that has 27,000 students, as well as the National Veterinary College (ENSV), and three other university campuses.

The commune has three schools:
The Lebdjaoui Mohamed School
The El Djorf School
The Mostapha Lachraf School

A new business district is in the process of construction in the south-east of the commune. It includes an Hotel Mercure and Ibis and has offices for Mobilis, Algérie Poste, CMA CGM, and Air Algerie in the shopping centre.

Algérie Poste is headquartered in Bab Ezzouar.  Ooredoo's operations in Algeria are based in the town, near the Mercer Hotel.

Notable people

Ismail Yafsah lived in the commune and was assassinated in the city that bears his name: Ismail Yafsah.
Zaho, singer, was born and raised in the commune - specifically in Cité Tahar Rabia building No. 13.
Rafik Saifi, footballer, was born and raised in the commune - specifically in the Cité du 8 Mai 1945 building No. 5.

See also

University of Sciences and Technology Houari Boumediene

External links
Plan of Bab Ezzouar 
USTHB website
Bab Ezzouar on Google Maps

References

Suburbs of Algiers
Communes of Algiers Province
Cities in Algeria